Raúl Pompa Victoria (born 6 November 1944) is a Mexican politician affiliated with the Institutional Revolutionary Party. As of 2014 he served as Deputy of the LIX Legislature of the Mexican Congress as a plurinominal representative.

References

1944 births
Living people
Politicians from Baja California
People from Tijuana
Members of the Chamber of Deputies (Mexico)
Institutional Revolutionary Party politicians
Universidad Autónoma de Guadalajara alumni
Members of the Congress of Baja California
20th-century Mexican politicians
21st-century Mexican politicians
Deputies of the LIX Legislature of Mexico